Liangjiang, officially known as Liangjiang New Area, is a state-level new area situated in the municipality of Chongqing, China. The area covers 1,205 square kilometres combining part of Jiangbei District, Yubei District, and Beibei District.

Overview
After Shanghai's Pudong New Area and Tianjin's Binhai New Area, China's only inland and third sub-provincial new area – Chongqing's Liangjiang New Area – was set up with the approval of the State Council on June 16, 2010, the 13th anniversary since Chongqing became China's fourth municipality. Liangjiang New Area, located in the main urban districts of Chongqing, north of the Yangtze River and east of the Jialing River, covers 1,200 square kilometers, of which 550 square kilometers is available for construction and composed of Jiangbei, Yubei and Beibei administrative district, the North New Zone and China's first inland bonded zone, Lianglu Cuntan Bonded Port Area. Chongqing Liangjiang New Area Development & Investment Group Co., Ltd. is in charge of constructing the industrial parks.

Strategic position
According to the approval of the State Council, Chongqing Liangjiang New Area will play roles of a pilot area for the comprehensive urban-rural reform; an important modern manufacturing base and comprehensive transport hub of China; a trade, commercial and logistics centre as well as a financial and technological innovation centre of the upper reaches of the Yangtze; an important gateway of the inland region opening to the outside world and a model for the scientific development.

Transport advantages
As the geographic core of the inland, Chongqing Municipality, located at the connection region of the west and middle China, enjoys a three-dimensional traffic network linking the south and north China and will form three transport hubs of China's fourth largest international airport, inland river transport's biggest port and the junction of eight railways. The local logistics cost is greatly cut with the new way created by Liangjiang New Area, the opening of New Eurasia Land Bridge and the access to the Indian Ocean, which provides advantageous conditions for the new area in attracting world's production factors and establishing a rapid carrying-over platform. All can indicate that Liangjiang New Area has been in the forefront of the opening-up project in inland China.

Reasonable space structure and industrial layout
In terms of space structure, Liangjiang New Area is divided into three sectors of modern service industry, advanced manufacturing industry and urban comprehensive functional zone and composed of ten functional zones of Jiangbeizui CBD, Bonded Areas, Yufu Modern Manufacturing and Logistics Zone, Longxing Advanced Manufacturing Zone, North Urban Economic Zone, Airport lingang Industrial Zone, Yulai Exhibition Center, Caijia Hi-tech Industrial Zone, Shuifu Ecosystem Industrial Zone and Mugu Export Processing Zone. In terms of industrial layout, the area will form five strategic industries of rail transit, electric power (nuclear power and wind power, etc.), new energy automobiles, electronic information and energy conservation materials. In addition, the layout will focus on 3 strategic functions of national research and development headquarters, important transformation base for scientific research achievements and data center. Furthermore, the area will speed up developing a group of emerging industry clusters to form a "5+3" layout.

Preferential policies
The State Council provides Liangjiang New Area with unprecedented preferential policies to increase support for further industry, capital and human talents development. The three preferential policies of West Development, coordination of the comprehensive urban and rural reform and experience of Pudong and Binhai new area will take effect in the area, marking Liangjiang New Area to be the one with most preferential policies in China. The area unveils a series of preferential policies, such as enterprises income tax is reduced to 15%, arousing great attention in the world.

Good foundation for development
Liangjiang New Area in an "old + new" style includes the inland China's only bonded port, the largest conference center in the west, finance and trade center and so on, while Pudong and Binhai new area were built from nothing. Liangjiang New Area gained a gross domestic product of around 80 billion yuan, 13 and 4 times of Pudong and Binhai at their beginning. On the basis of "take Chongqing as the base, provide service to west China, depend on the economy belt along the Yangtze River, open to the outside world", the CPC Chongqing Committee and Chongqing Municipal Government definite the "Three Three-Step Strategy" for the Development of Liangjiang New Area, "to achieve initial success in 2 years, to take a shape in 5 years and to basically complete in 10 years". The area in 2012 will get the gross domestic product (GDP) of 0.16 trillion yuan with an increase of 100%; in 2015, the GDP will be more than 0.32 trillion yuan; in 2020, Liangjiang New Area will be the inland China's open model with modern functions, advanced industries, gathering headquarters, livable environment and international influence. Its GDP and industrial gross output will hit 0.64 trillion and 1 trillion yuan respectively, which is the same as "reconstructing one more Chongqing industry and Chongqing economy in 10 years".

References

External links
 Liangjiang New Area official website

New areas (China)
2010 establishments in China
Economy of Chongqing
Geography of Chongqing